Pteridophyllum is a genus of flowering plant endemic to Japan. Its only species is Pteridophyllum racemosum. The genus was formerly placed in the mono-generic family Pteridophyllaceae, which is now included within the Papaveraceae.

References

Papaveraceae
Monotypic Papaveraceae genera
Endemic flora of Japan
Taxa named by Adrien René Franchet